The Goodyear F2G Corsair, often referred to as the "Super Corsair", is a development by the Goodyear Aircraft Company of the Vought F4U Corsair fighter aircraft. The F2G was intended as a low-altitude interceptor and was equipped with a 28-cylinder, four-row Pratt & Whitney R-4360 air-cooled radial engine.

Such a fighter was first conceived in 1939, when Pratt & Whitney first proposed the immense, 3,000 hp (2,200 kW) R-4360, and design work began in early 1944.

Design and development

Using experience gained building the F4U-1 under license – a variant known as the FG-1 – in early 1944, Goodyear modified a standard Corsair airframe to take advantage of the 50% increase in take-off power provided by the R-4360 engine. Known as the XF2G-1, the aircraft also featured a new all-round vision bubble-type canopy.

A land-based variant, with manually-folding wings, was to be known as the F2G-1, while a carrier version with hydraulically-folding wings and arrestor hook was to be called the F2G-2. In March 1944, Goodyear was awarded a contract to deliver 418 F2G-1 and 10 F2G-2 aircraft.

Armament was to include four or six wing-mounted 0.5-inch (12.7 mm) machine guns and eight 5-inch (127 mm) rockets or two 1,000 or 1,600 lb (450 or 725 kg) bombs. The internal fuel capacity of the F2G was increased greatly over that of the F4U, and provisions were also made for two droptanks.

However, post-production testing revealed deficiencies in lateral control and insufficient speed, which were bars to further development of the design. In addition, the Grumman F8F Bearcat – a rival design that had also entered production – had performance comparable to the F2G, even though it was powered with the same engine as the original F4U. By the end of the war in August 1945, when only 10 aircraft (five examples of each variant) had been completed, further production of the F2G was canceled.

Variants
XF2G-1: prototype.  One converted from a standard FG-1 Corsair.

F2G-1: land-based variant, 418 ordered, five built, order cancelled.

F2G-2: carrier-based variant, 10 ordered, five built, order cancelled.

Operators

United States Navy

Surviving aircraft

Only two "Super Corsairs" still remain, after the others crashed, and only one of them is in flying condition.

 Airworthy (F2G-1)
 88458 (better known as "Race 57"): privately owned in Bentonville, Arkansas.  It was the fifth production aircraft and was purchased by Cook Cleland, who went on to finish first in the 1947 Thompson Trophy Race and first in the 1949 Tinnerman Trophy Race. Over time, the aircraft, registered as NX5588N, went from owner to owner and slowly deteriorated. Finally, in 1996, NX5588N was purchased by Bob Odegaard of North Dakota, and was returned to airworthy condition in 1999. The aircraft was on loan to the Fargo Air Museum. Odegaard raced the aircraft in the Unlimited class at the Reno Air Races from 2006 to 2008  and it was featured in the movie Thunder Over Reno. The aircraft was bought in February, 2017 by Steuart Walton. It is based at Louise M. Thaden Airfield in Bentonville, Arkansas.

 On display (F2G-1)
 88454: Museum of Flight in Seattle, Washington. It was the first production aircraft and was acquired from the Marine Corps by the Champlin Fighter Museum, and later came to the Museum of Flight in Seattle with the rest of the Champlin collection.

Specifications (F2G-2)

See also

References

Notes

Citations

Bibliography

 Dorr, Robert F. US Fighters of World War Two. London, UK, Arms and Armour Press, 1991.  
 Green, William. War Planes of the Second World War - Fighters (Vol. 4). New York: MacDonald and Company, 1961.
 Lockett, Brian. "Corsairs with Four-bank Radials". Goleta Air and Space Museum. Retrieved: 16 January 2007.
 Pautigny, Bruno (translated from the French by Alan McKay). Corsair: 30 Years of Filibustering 1940-1970. Paris: Histoire & Collections, 2003. .
 "Racing Corsairs." Society of Air Racing Historians. Retrieved: 16 January 2007.

External links

 F2G-1 Corsair on display at the Museum of Flight in Seattle
 F2G-1D Corsair in flying condition at Odegaard Aviation

Goodyear aircraft
Inverted gull-wing aircraft
Racing aircraft
1940s United States fighter aircraft
Single-engined tractor aircraft
Aircraft first flown in 1945